Shiloh is a 1996 American family drama film produced and directed by Dale Rosenbloom. It was shown at the Heartland Film Festival in 1996, but its general release came on April 25, 1997. The original book by the same name was written by Phyllis Reynolds Naylor. There are two sequels, Shiloh 2: Shiloh Season (1999) and Saving Shiloh (2006), both directed by Sandy Tung and distributed by Utopia Pictures.

Plot
An abused Beagle puppy runs away from his cruel owner, Judd Travers, and meets a boy named Marty Preston, who names him Shiloh. Marty's strict father, Ray, will not let Marty keep Shiloh because he is not their dog. Having personally witnessed Judd's mistreatment of Shiloh, Marty is reluctant to return him, but has no choice. After Shiloh is mistreated again, the dog returns to Marty. Knowing his father will make him return Shiloh, Marty hides him in a shed behind his house.

His secret is soon revealed when his mother, Louise, comes up the hill and sees Marty and Shiloh bonding. Ray soon finds out what Marty is doing when a violent German Shepherd belonging to the Baker family savages Shiloh, and Marty is forced to call upon him for help. Ray and Marty take Shiloh to their friend Dr. Wallace to be attended to. Marty urges his father to keep Shiloh, pleading about how Judd abuses the dog. Ray initially agrees to keep Shiloh until he recovers, and tries not to become attached to Shiloh. That night, when Ray thinks Marty is asleep he gives the dog a treat, and soon his heart softens.

Eventually Marty goes to see Judd, and threatens to report him for trying to shoot a rabbit out of hunting season, unless he agrees to sell Shiloh. Judd agrees, but instead of money, wants 20 hours of Marty's work on his house as payment. After Marty has completed the work, Judd refuses to follow through, saying that there were no witnesses to the deal. He and Marty get into a fight, and Marty tells him he will never get Shiloh back. Marty keeps Shiloh for the next few days, until Judd comes again to take the dog. Marty fights with Judd again about keeping Shiloh with the help of Ray.

Judd then tries to kidnap Shiloh. Ray comes to the rescue and knocks Judd down, and they both fight. Judd escapes Ray, grabs Shiloh, and drives away in his truck. As he's leaving, however, Judd begins to reconsider, and eventually releases Shiloh from his truck and the dog runs into Marty's arms.

Cast 
 Michael Moriarty as Raymond "Ray" Preston
 Blake Heron as Martin "Marty" Preston
 Scott Wilson as Judd Travers
 Ann Dowd as Louise "Lou" Preston
 J. Madison Wright as Samantha "Sam" Wallace
  Shira Roth as Dara Lynn Preston
  Tori Wright as Rebecca "Becky" Preston
 Bonnie Bartlett as Mrs. Wallace
 Rod Steiger as Dr. Wallace
 Frannie as Shiloh

Reception
Roger Ebert gave the film 3.5 stars out of 4, calling it "a remarkably mature and complex story about a boy who loves a dog and cannot bear to see it mistreated" and that "it deals with real moral issues: with property, responsibility and honesty, and with whether there is a higher good that justifies breaking ordinary rules". On Rotten Tomatoes it has a rating of 73% based on reviews from 11 critics.

References

External links
 
 
 

1996 films
1996 drama films
Warner Bros. films
American children's drama films
Films scored by Joel Goldsmith
Films about dogs
Films based on American novels
Films based on children's books
Films about pets
1996 directorial debut films
1990s English-language films
1990s American films